Menominee County is a county  in the U.S. state of Wisconsin. As of the 2020 census, the population was 4,255, making it the least populous county in Wisconsin. Its county seat is in the community of Keshena.

Menominee is Wisconsin's newest county, having been created in 1959 after recognition of the Menominee tribe was terminated by federal law. In 1974, the tribe regained federal recognition and restoration of most of its reservation. Today Menominee County is essentially coterminous with the boundaries of the federally recognized Menominee Indian Reservation.

Menominee County is included in the Shawano, WI Micropolitan Statistical Area, which is also included in the Green Bay-Shawano, WI Combined Statistical Area.

History
The county was created from the northeastern portion of 7 townships of Shawano County and the Western 3 townships of Oconto County on July 3, 1959, in anticipation of the termination of the Menominee Indian Reservation in 1961. The reservation status was restored in 1973, and is now co-extensive with the county.

Most of the land within the county boundary is under Federal trust for the exclusive use by enrolled members of the Menominee nation. Scattered parcels that were purchased during termination, as well as many lots around the Legend Lake area in the southeastern part of the county, are the only parts of the county that are privately owned by non-Native Americans. Most of Menominee County's population consists of members of the Menominee nation.

Geography
It is the second-smallest county in Wisconsin by total area.

Adjacent counties

 Oconto County – east
 Shawano County – south
 Langlade County – northwest

Major highways
  Highway 47 (Wisconsin)
  Highway 55 (Wisconsin)

Buses
List of intercity bus stops in Wisconsin

Demographics

2020 census
Note: the US Census treats Hispanic/Latino as an ethnic category. This table excludes Latinos from the racial categories and assigns them to a separate category. Hispanics/Latinos can be of any race.

As of the 2020 United States census, there were 4,255 people, 1,400 households, and 1,064 families residing in the county. The racial makeup of the county (including Hispanics and Latinos) was 85.6% Native American, 11.8% White, 0.1% Pacific Islander, 0.1% from other races, and 2.4% from two or more races. Ethnically, the population was 3.2% Hispanic or Latino of any race.

2000 census
At the 2000 census there were 4,562 people, 1,345 households, and 1,065 families in the county. This total makes it the least-populated county in the state. The population density was 13 people per square mile (5/km2). There were 2,098 housing units at an average density of 6 per square mile (2/km2).  The racial makup of the county was 11.57% White, 0.07% Black or African American, 87.26% Native American, 0.02% Pacific Islander, 0.33% from other races, and 0.75% from two or more races. 2.67%. were Hispanic or Latino of any race. 5.0% were of German ancestry. 89.8% spoke English, 7.0% Menominee and 1.6% Hmong as their first language. At over 80% of the county's population, Menominee County has the highest percentage of Native Americans in the state of Wisconsin by far.

Of the 1,345 households 42.20% had children under the age of 18 living with them, 42.50% were married couples living together, 26.60% had a female householder with no husband present, and 20.80% were non-families. 16.50% of households were one person and 6.40% were one person aged 65 or older. The average household size was 3.35 and the average family size was 3.66.

The age distribution was 38.90% under the age of 18, 8.40% from 18 to 24, 24.70% from 25 to 44, 19.50% from 45 to 64, and 8.50% 65 or older. The median age was 28 years. For every 100 females there were 97.30 males. For every 100 females age 18 and over, there were 92.30 males.

In 2017, there were 89 births, giving a general fertility rate of 115.9 births per 1000 women aged 15–44, the highest rate out of all 72 Wisconsin counties.

Politics

Menominee County has voted strongly Democratic in every election since 1964. In every election since its creation, Menominee has been the most Democratic-leaning county in Wisconsin. It is one of only three counties in the entire nation that has never voted Republican, the others being Jim Hogg and Brooks counties in South Texas.

Communities

Menominee County is one of only two counties in Wisconsin with no incorporated communities, the other being Florence County.

Town
 Menominee

Census-designated places
 Keshena (county seat)
 Legend Lake
 Middle Village (partial)
 Neopit
 Zoar

Ghost town/neighborhood
 Perote

See also
 National Register of Historic Places listings in Menominee County, Wisconsin

References

External links
 Menominee County government website
 Town of Menominee government
 Menominee County map from the Wisconsin Department of Transportation
 Legend Lake Community

 
1959 establishments in Wisconsin
Populated places established in 1959